The 5th Army Corps was a military unit of the French Army which fought in the Franco-Prussian War and both World Wars.  It comprised three divisions.

The last commander was René Altmayer (June 1940).

Footnotes

References 
 Weygand, Maxime, "Weygand, Memoires, Part I", Paris: Flammarion, 1953

Corps of France in World War I
Corps of France in World War II
Military units and formations established in 1906
1906 establishments in France